The 1980–81 daytime network television schedule for the three major English-language commercial broadcast networks in the United States covers the weekday and weekend daytime hours from September 1980 to August 1981.

Legend

 New series are highlighted in bold.

Schedule
 All times correspond to U.S. Eastern and Pacific Time scheduling (except for some live sports or events). Except where affiliates slot certain programs outside their network-dictated timeslots, subtract one hour for Central, Mountain, Alaska, and Hawaii-Aleutian times.
 Local schedules may differ, as affiliates have the option to pre-empt or delay network programs. Such scheduling may be limited to preemptions caused by local or national breaking news or weather coverage (which may force stations to tape delay certain programs to other timeslots) and any major sports events scheduled to air in a weekday timeslot (mainly during major holidays). Stations may air shows at other times at their preference.

Monday–Friday

Notes
ABC had a 6PM (ET)/5PM (CT) feed for World News Tonight, depending on stations' schedule.

Saturday

In the News aired ten times during CBS' Saturday morning shows.

Ask NBC News aired after the credits of NBC's Saturday morning shows except Batman and the Super 7, Jonny Quest, and Drawing Power. Time Out aired after Jonny Quest.

Sunday

By network

ABC

Returning series
ABC Weekend Special
ABC World News Tonight
All My Children
American Bandstand 
Animals, Animals, Animals
The Edge of Night
Family Feud
General Hospital
Good Morning America
Issues and Answers
Kids Are People Too
The Love Boat 
One Life to Live
The Plasticman/Baby Plas Super Comedy
Schoolhouse Rock!

New series
The Fonz and the Happy Days Gang
Heathcliff and Dingbat
The Richie Rich/Scooby-Doo Show and Scrappy Too!
Super Friends
Three's Company 
Thundarr the Barbarian

Canceled/Ended
The $20,000 Pyramid 
Captain Caveman and the Teen Angels
Laff-A-Lympics
Laverne & Shirley
Scooby-Doo and Scrappy-Doo
Spider-Woman
The World's Greatest Super Friends

CBS

Returning series
30 Minutes
Alice 
The All New Popeye Hour
As the World Turns
The Bugs Bunny/Road Runner Show 
Captain Kangaroo
CBS Evening News
CBS News Sunday Morning
Face the Nation
Guiding Light
Jason of Star Command 
The Jeffersons 
Morning
The New Adventures of Mighty Mouse and Heckle & Jeckle
The New Fat Albert Show
One Day at a Time 
The Price Is Right
The Robonic Stooges 
Search for Tomorrow
The Skatebirds 
Sunrise Semester
The Young and the Restless

New series
Drak Pack
The Tarzan/Lone Ranger Adventure Hour
The Tom and Jerry Comedy Show

Canceled/Ended
Beat the Clock
Love of Life
Shazam!
Tarzan and the Super 7
Whew! / Celebrity Whew!

NBC

Returning series
Another World
Card Sharks
The Daffy Duck Show 
Days of Our Lives
The Doctors
Fred and Barney Meet the Shmoo
Gambit (renamed Las Vegas Gambit)
Godzilla 
The Godzilla / Dynomutt Hour 
Hong Kong Phooey 
The Jetsons 
Jonny Quest  
Meet the Press
NBC Nightly News
Password Plus
Texas
Today
Wheel of Fortune

New series
Batman and the Super 7
Blockbusters
Drawing Power
The Flintstone Comedy Show

Canceled/Ended
Casper and the Angels
Chain Reaction
The David Letterman Show
Fred and Barney Meet the Thing
The Godzilla/Globetrotters Adventure Hour
High Rollers
The Hollywood Squares
Hot Hero Sandwich
Mindreaders
The New Adventures of Flash Gordon
The New Shmoo
The Super Globetrotters

See also
1980-81 United States network television schedule (prime-time)
1980-81 United States network television schedule (late night)

Sources
https://web.archive.org/web/20071015122215/http://curtalliaume.com/abc_day.html
https://web.archive.org/web/20071015122235/http://curtalliaume.com/cbs_day.html
https://web.archive.org/web/20071012211242/http://curtalliaume.com/nbc_day.html

United States weekday network television schedules
1980 in American television
1981 in American television